The tornado outbreak sequence of June 3–11, 2008 affected much of the central United States and parts of Canada starting on June 3, 2008 and lasting until June 11; 192 tornadoes were confirmed.

The first outbreak affected much of the Midwest and Ohio Valley area on June 3 producing over 20 tornado reports including an EF3 in Moscow, Indiana. Several people were injured, including one critically who died two months later.

The second outbreak took place across the Central Plains where two days of severe weather resulted in at least 90 tornado reports from the Dakotas to Kansas on June 4–5.

The third outbreak took place across Wisconsin and Illinois, where at least 20 tornadoes were confirmed including eight across the southern suburbs of Chicago on June 7, as well as a dozen others in southern Wisconsin.

The fourth outbreak took place across the Central Plains where at least four people were killed near Little Sioux, Iowa. At least 58 tornadoes were reported on June 11 mostly over Minnesota, Iowa, Kansas and Minnesota. The strongest tornado was an EF4 in Manhattan, Kansas. Two people were in killed in Kansas in the towns of Chapman and Soldier. At least 17 tornadoes were reported on June 11 mostly over Wisconsin and Kansas.

Confirmed tornadoes

Note: Four tornadoes in Canada were rated according to the Fujita scale, but are included in the table using their corresponding number rating.

June 3 event

June 4 event

June 5 event

June 6 event

June 7 event

June 8 event

June 9 event

June 10 event

June 11 event

See also
 List of North American tornadoes and tornado outbreaks
 Tornadoes of 2008

References

Tornadoes of 2008
F4 tornadoes by date
Tornado outbreak sequence